Wolf Boneder (20 October 1894 – 13 September 1977) was a German athlete. He competed in the men's high jump at the 1928 Summer Olympics.

References

External links
 

1894 births
1977 deaths
Athletes (track and field) at the 1928 Summer Olympics
German male high jumpers
Olympic athletes of Germany
Place of birth missing